Maylani Ah Hoy (born 24 September 1975 in Western Samoa) is a tennis player and coach from Samoa. In 2016 she coached Samoan Paralympian athlete Maggie Aiono for her appearance at the 2016 Summer Paralympics.

Playing for Pacific Oceania in Fed Cup, Ah Hoy has a W/L record of 2–3.

Life 
Ah Hoy attended Brigham Young University-Hawaii and represented the university in tennis. In 2011 she represented Samoa at the Pacific Games, winning a bronze medal in the mixed doubles. In 2012 she represented Samoa at the Oceania Tennis Championships, winning gold in the women's doubles. 

In 2016, Ah Hoy coached Maggie Aiono for the Paralympics, and the following year she coached Samoan tennis player Milo Toleafoa for his appearance at the 2017 Pacific Mini Games.

Other finals

Singles

Doubles

Mixed doubles

References

External links 
 

1975 births
Living people
Samoan female tennis players